Loudoun County Public Schools (LCPS) is a branch of the Loudoun County, Virginia, United States government, and administers public schools in the county. LCPS's headquarters is located at 21000 Education Court in Ashburn, an unincorporated section of the county.

Due to rapid growth in the region, LCPS is one of the fastest-growing school divisions in Virginia and the third largest school division in the state. For the 2019–2020 school year, LCPS educated approximately 84,000 students.

History 
The public school system in Loudoun County was established in 1870 to fulfill the needs for free education during the Reconstruction era after the Civil War. For most of its history, LCPS served a rural population known mainly for its dairy farms. Since the opening of Washington Dulles International Airport in 1962, Loudoun County's population has skyrocketed, accompanied by that of the school system. For example, since the 2000–2001 school year, LCPS has opened 51 schools: 28 elementary, 11 middle, 11 high and one educational center.

In the 20th century, including during the civil rights movement and the era of massive resistance, LCPS was one of the last school districts in the nation to begin desegregation in 1967. In 2020 the school board, the administration, and the county board issued a public apology for its "blatant disregard and disrespect of Black people".

Administration
The LCPS system, while operated on a day-to-day basis by the Superintendent (Dr. Daniel Smith (Interim)), is managed under the direction and authority of the Loudoun County School Board, a nine-member panel elected by citizens in the county. Eight of the nine board positions are divided among voting districts that represent communities throughout the county, while the ninth seat is elected at-large by the entire county. The voting districts correspond to those used for Loudoun County Board of Supervisors elections. Unlike the Board of Supervisors, the chairmanship of the School Board is elected annually by its members, while the Chairman of the Board of Supervisors is always the at-large seat. While the School Board makes decisions relating to school policy and curriculum, it receives funding through the Board of Supervisors.

On August 31, 2021, the Broad Run District member, Leslee King, died from complications due to a heart surgery. On October 12, 2021, Andrew Hoyler was appointed to serve as the interim Broad Run District member through November 15, 2022. Hoyler ran against King in 2019 and lost with 37% of the vote to King's 61%. A special election was held in November 2022 with Tiffany Polifko elected in a three-way race, by a 98-vote margin, to serve as the Broad Run member through the end of the term on December 31, 2023. On October 15, 2021, the Leesburg District member, Beth Barts, announced her resignation effective November 2, 2021, citing threats and fear for her and her family's safety. Barts was facing a recall petition over claims that her participation in a private Facebook group violated the School Board's Code of Conduct and open meeting laws. On December 14, 2021, Tom Marshall was appointed to serve as the interim Leesburg District member through November 15, 2022. Marshall previously served on the School Board from 2008 to 2011 and from 2016 to 2019, both terms as the Leesburg District member. A special election was held in November 2022 with Erika Ogedegbe elected in a three-way race to serve as the Leesburg member through the end of the term on December 31, 2023. Sterling District member, Brenda Sheridan, and Algonkian District member, Atoosa Reaser, are also facing recall petitions for similar reasons as Barts. Sheridan and Reaser served as Chair and Vice-Chair, respectively, in 2020 and 202. Sheridan also served as Vice-Chair from 2016 through 2019. Dulles District Member, Jeff Morse, served as Chair of the School Board in 2022 with Blue Ridge District Member, Ian Serotkin, serving as Vice-Chair. Morse previously served as Chair from 2017 through 2019. In January 2023, Serotkin was elected to serve as Chair with Ashburn District Member, Harris Mahedavi, elected to serve as Vice-Chair.

Demographics
In the 2021–2022 school year, LCPS students were 42.7% White, 25.4% Asian, 18.3% Hispanic/Latino, 7.1% Black/African American, 5.7% Multiracial, 0.6% Native American, and 0.1% Pacific Islander.

2021 sexual assaults

Sexual assaults and charges
On May 28, 2021, a male teenager was accused of sexually assaulting a female student in a girls' restroom at Stone Bridge High School in Ashburn. The two had agreed to meet in the restroom, where they had previously engaged in consensual sexual encounters. School officials immediately reported the assault to law enforcement. Following a weeks-long investigation by the Loudoun County Sheriff's Office, a 14-year-old male was arrested on July 8, 2021, and charged with two counts of forcible sodomy. The suspect spent time in a juvenile detention facility before being released and placed on electronic monitoring. He was transferred to Broad Run High School in Ashburn.

On October 6, 2021, the same male teenager, aged 15 at the time, was accused of sexually assaulting a female student in an empty classroom at Broad Run High School. The male student was arrested the following day and charged with sexual battery and abduction of a fellow student. He was again held in a juvenile detention facility.

On October 25, 2021, the suspect was found guilty on all charges for the May 28 assault. On November 15, 2021, the suspect pleaded no contest to a felony charge of abduction and a misdemeanor count of sexual battery for the October 6 assault. He was set to be sentenced on December 13, 2021, but sentencing was delayed until January 2022 in order for the court to perform a psychology evaluation on him and explore residential treatment facility options. In January 2022, the suspect was found guilty on all four charges and was sentenced to complete a "residential program in a locked-down facility" and placed on supervised probation until he turned 18, and ordered to register as a sex offender in Virginia. Loudoun County Juvenile Judge Court Judge Pamela L. Brooks said she had never previously ordered a minor to register as a sex offender, stating, "You scare me. What I read in those reports scared me and should scare families and scare society. You need a lot of help." The perpetrator apologized to the two victims in court. Judge Brooks said that there was a third victim who had not come forward to press charges. 
Later that month, Brooks decided against placing the perpetrator on the sex offender registry, due to the offender's young age and data indicating that teenagers placed on the registry go on to have higher recidivism rates.

Policy 8040 and responses
Policy 8040, which was passed in August 2021, a few months after the first assault occurred, allows students to use locker rooms and bathrooms corresponding to their "consistently asserted gender identity"; the policy was adopted to comply with a state mandate. The parents of the Stone Bridge victim have said the perpetrator of their daughter's assault identified as gender fluid. While discussing a draft of Policy 8040 at a school board meeting on June 22, 2021, superintendent Scott Ziegler stated that, to his knowledge, there were no reports of any assaults occurring in the school system's restrooms and that a "predator transgender student or person simply does not exist". The father of the Stone Bridge victim stated he was angered by Ziegler's comments due to his daughter's assault, and was arrested at the meeting after getting into an argument with a fellow attendee; he was found guilty of disorderly conduct and resisting arrest on August 17, 2021. The parents of the Stone Bridge victim accused the school system of covering up the assault to push Policy 8040. The Loudoun County Sheriff's Office stated they were immediately made aware by school officials of the assault on May 28. Authorities have not commented on the parents' "gender fluid" characterization of the perpetrator, but have said he was wearing a skirt at the time of the assault. On October 15, 2021, Ziegler said he "wrongly interpreted" questions posed to him at that meeting and apologized, calling his comments "misleading". Later that month, the perpetrator's lawyer refuted the characterization of his then-client as gender fluid or transgender.

At a school board meeting on October 12, 2021, parents criticized the handling of the assaults, expressing fear for their children's safety in Loudoun County Public Schools and calling for the school board, and superintendent Ziegler, to resign. During an October 15, 2021 press conference, Ziegler acknowledged that the school system had "failed to provide the safe, welcoming, and affirming environment" they aspired to. He went on to state that federal policy contained in Title IX had required a full investigation of the assaults before certain disciplinary actions were allowed to be taken and that he would lobby for changes to this part of Title IX. He also proposed local policy changes that he said would "place greater emphasis on victim rights". These local changes, Ziegler said, would ensure the future separation of "alleged offenders from the general student body" and allow disciplinary actions to begin before the end of any future investigations of assault.

A September 29, 2021 letter from the National School Boards Association (NSBA) to President Joe Biden characterized parents from various school board meetings as "domestic terrorists", including the father of the Stone Bridge victim, citing his arrest at the June 22 meeting. In October 2021, the father demanded an apology and retraction from the NSBA. His attorneys said that the NSBA released an apology to other NSBA members on October 22 but "did not include any specific apology" to him or other parents.

School students across Loudoun County, including students at Stone Bridge High School and Broad Run High School, performed walkout protests on October 26, 2021, in support of the victims.

During his successful campaign for governor of Virginia, Glenn Youngkin responded to the assaults by arguing for an increased police presence in the state's schools. On his first day in office, January 15, 2022, Youngkin signed an executive order requesting that the Virginia Attorney General, Jason Miyares, conduct an investigation into the school system's handling of the assaults.

The assaults coincided with vocal opposition among some parents towards the Loudoun County school system's COVID-19 prevention strategies and racial equity programs. Amid these controversies, several members of the Loudoun County School Board were harassed and received death threats. The New York Times noted that conservative media coverage of the assaults "zeroed in on the transgender angle", and Youngkin's Democratic opponent, Terry McAuliffe, argued that conservatives were exploiting the issue as a "transphobic dog whistle". The New York Times further noted that early media coverage of the assaults failed to report that the victim and assailant "had an ongoing sexual relationship" before the assault occurred "and had arranged to meet in the bathroom."

On March 8, 2022, the Loudoun County School Board voted to adopt an overhaul of the school's Title IX policies that had been in development since the beginning of 2020. Under the reformed policy, a Title IX coordinator is charged with ensuring an immediate investigation and response to instances of "sex discrimination, sexual harassment, or sexual misconduct". The reformed policy also states, "If appropriate and regardless of whether a criminal or regulatory investigation regarding the alleged conduct is pending, the school division shall promptly take interim action to maintain a safe and secure learning environment for all students."

Dismissal of Superintendent Ziegler 
On December 6, 2022, Superintendent of LCPS Scott Ziegler was fired "without cause" and with immediate effect by a unanimous vote at a closed session school board meeting. He was fired due to the school district's response to the 2021 sexual assault cases. Specifically, a grand jury report had concluded that Ziegler was informed about the assault on the day that it happened but he later lied about his knowledge of the event during a school board meeting the following month. Glenn Youngkin reacted on December 7, 2022, by tweeting "The special grand jury’s report on the horrific sexual assaults in Loudoun has exposed wrongdoing, prompted disciplinary actions, & provided families with the truth. I will continue to empower parents & push for accountability on behalf of our students." Ziegler's removal was faced with positive statements from people in Loudoun County. Nevertheless, because he was dismissed "without cause" Ziegler will continue to receive full benefits and his $323,000 annual salary for the next year. Three criminal charges against Zeigler were made public days later, on December 12, following a judicial order to unseal the grand jury indictments against him and a district employee.

Schools

High schools
With the opening of Lightridge High School, Loudoun County has 17 high schools. All but two high schools, Loudoun Valley and Broad Run, are two stories. Loudoun County (1954), the oldest high school, can hold around 1,370 students, Loudoun Valley (1962) and Broad Run (1969) can hold around 1,390–1,410 (Loudoun Valley and Broad Run were built with a similar design), Park View (1976) can hold about 1,370 and Potomac Falls (1997) can hold about 1,400. Potomac Falls' design has been used with every high school in Loudoun County built after it (with the exception of Lightridge High School), with a bigger auditorium and more classrooms. Stone Bridge (2000), Heritage (2002),  Dominion (2003), Briar Woods (2005), Freedom (2005), and Woodgrove (2010) can hold 1,600 students, and Independence High School (2019) can hold 1,576 students. With the opening of Tuscarora High School (2010), and John Champe High School (2012), the new high schools still use the Potomac Falls design template but with an 1800 student capacity. When Riverside High School (HS-8) in 2015, and Rock Ridge High School (HS-7) opened in 2014 it had a 1,600 student capacity not the standard 1,800 because of little increase in student population foreseen in the Ashburn area. The 2019–2020 year introduced Independence High School (HS-11) with a newer and refreshed design of Potomac Falls. The 2020–2021 year introduced Lightridge High School (HS-9) with a new design different from Potomac Falls High School. The school opened to reduce overcrowding at John Champe High School.

All high schools serve grades 9–12.

Briar Woods High School, Ashburn
Broad Run High School, Ashburn
Dominion High School, Sterling
Freedom High School, South Riding
Heritage High School, Leesburg
Independence High School, Ashburn
John Champe High School, Aldie
Lightridge High School, Aldie
Loudoun County High School, Leesburg
Loudoun Valley High School, Purcellville
Park View High School, Sterling
Potomac Falls High School, Sterling
Riverside High School, Leesburg
Rock Ridge High School, Ashburn
Stone Bridge High School, Ashburn
Tuscarora High School, Leesburg
Woodgrove High School, Purcellville

Middle schools 
Loudoun County currently has 17 middle schools, all of which typically feed into one high school currently, or in the near future. Older middle schools such as Simpson, Blue Ridge, Sterling, and Seneca Ridge originally were able to carry about 1,000 students, but have all gone or are going through expansion projects that will allow them to carry 1,200 students once the projects are complete. The older schools are also trying to modernize the building by placing ornamental designs throughout the school. Newer middle schools built since 1995, when Farmwell Station opened, typically have capacities of 1,200 to 1,350 students depending on the age of the building and how fast growth was around the particular school when the school opened. Since the opening of J. Michael Lunsford, all middle schools are built with a two-story design that can carry 1,350 students.

Serves grades 6–8.

Belmont Ridge Middle School, Leesburg
Blue Ridge Middle School, Purcellville
Brambleton Middle School, Ashburn
Eagle Ridge Middle School, Ashburn
Farmwell Station Middle School, Ashburn
Harmony Middle School (Formerly Harmony Intermediate School), Hamilton
Harper Park Middle School, Leesburg
J. Lupton Simpson Middle School, Leesburg
J. Michael Lunsford Middle School, Chantilly
Mercer Middle School, Aldie
River Bend Middle School, Sterling
Seneca Ridge Middle School, Sterling
Smarts Mill Middle School, Leesburg
Sterling Middle School, Sterling
Stone Hill Middle School, Ashburn
Trailside Middle School, Ashburn
Willard Middle School (Formerly Willard Intermediate School), Aldie

Intermediate schools
Serves grades 8–9.

LCPS previously had two intermediate schools

 Harmony Intermediate School, now Harmony Middle School in the western part of the county which served 8th and 9th graders. This was only a temporary concept to relieve crowding at Blue Ridge Middle School and Loudoun Valley High School which ended after Woodgrove High School opened in fall 2010.
 Willard Intermediate School, now Willard Middle School in Aldie also served 8th and 9th graders. This was only a temporary concept to relieve crowding at Mercer Middle School and John Champe High School which ended after Lightridge High School opened in fall 2020.

Elementary schools
LCPS currently has 52 elementary schools, which are nearly all community based, with over half of them opening in the last 10 years. Newer elementary schools throughout the county can carry approximately 800 to 875 students. Older elementary schools in the eastern part of the county can carry anywhere from 400–600 students. There are some rural elementary schools in Loudoun County as well, nearly all of them in the western part of the county. They are much smaller in size and are much older facilities, typically holding enrollments of about 100–150 students. Since the opening of Buffalo Trail Elementary School, all elementary schools are built with a two-story design that can carry 875 students.

Another elementary school (currently unnamed, referred to as ES-32) is planned for construction between Lightridge High School and Hovatter Elementary School, with an expected opening in time for the 2024-2025 school year.

Serves grades K–5.

Aldie Elementary School, Aldie
Algonkian Elementary School, Sterling
Arcola Elementary School, Aldie
Ashburn Elementary School, Ashburn
Ball's Bluff Elementary School, Leesburg
Banneker Elementary School, Saint Louis
Belmont Station Elementary School, Ashburn
Buffalo Trail Elementary School, Aldie
Cardinal Ridge Elementary School, Centreville
Catoctin Elementary School, Leesburg
Cedar Lane Elementary School, Ashburn
Cool Spring Elementary School, Leesburg
Countryside Elementary School, Sterling
Creighton's Corner Elementary School, Ashburn
Discovery Elementary School, Ashburn
Dominion Trail Elementary School, Ashburn
Elaine E. Thompson Elementary School, Arcola
Emerick Elementary School, Purcellville
Evergreen Mill Elementary School, Leesburg
Forest Grove Elementary School, Sterling
Frances Hazel Reid Elementary School, Leesburg
Frederick Douglass Elementary School, Leesburg
Goshen Post Elementary School, Aldie
Guilford Elementary School, Sterling
Hamilton Elementary School, Hamilton
Hillsboro Charter Academy (formerly Hillsboro Elementary School), Purcellville
Hillside Elementary School, Ashburn
Horizon Elementary School, Sterling
Hovatter Elementary School, Aldie
Hutchison Farm Elementary School, South Riding
John W. Tolbert Jr. Elementary School, Leesburg
Kenneth Culbert Elementary School, Hamilton
Leesburg Elementary School, Leesburg
Legacy Elementary School, Ashburn
Liberty Elementary School, South Riding
Lincoln Elementary School, Purcellville
Little River Elementary School, South Riding
Lovettsville Elementary School, Lovettsville
Lowes Island Elementary School, Sterling
Lucketts Elementary School, Leesburg
Madison's Trust Elementary School, Ashburn
Meadowland Elementary School, Sterling
Middleburg Community Charter School (formerly Middleburg Elementary School), Middleburg
Mill Run Elementary School, Ashburn
Moorefield Station Elementary School, Ashburn
Mountain View Elementary School, Purcellville
Newton-Lee Elementary School, Ashburn
Pinebrook Elementary School, Aldie
Potowmack Elementary School, Sterling
Rolling Ridge Elementary School, Sterling
Rosa Lee Carter Elementary School, Ashburn
Round Hill Elementary School, Round Hill
Sanders Corner Elementary School, Ashburn
Seldens Landing Elementary School, Lansdowne
Sterling Elementary School, Sterling
Steuart W. Weller Elementary School, Ashburn
Sugarland Elementary School, Sterling
Sully Elementary School, Sterling
Sycolin Creek Elementary School, Leesburg
Waterford Elementary School, Waterford
Waxpool Elementary School, Ashburn

Instructional centers
Academies of Loudoun, Leesburg
Monroe Advanced Technical Academy (MATA)
Academy of Science (AOS)
 Academy of Engineering & Technology (AET)
The North Star School (formerly named Douglass) Leesburg (alternative education center)

School Board history

See also

List of school divisions in Virginia

Notes

References

External links
 
 LCPS at U.S. News & World Reports Best High Schools

School divisions in Virginia
Education in Loudoun County, Virginia
Northern Virginia
1870 establishments in Virginia
Government in Loudoun County, Virginia